Sayyid Khalifa I bin Said al-Busaidi, GCMG,  (or Chalîfe) (1852 – 13 February 1890) was the third Sultan of Zanzibar. He ruled Zanzibar from 26 March 1888 to 13 February 1890 and was succeeded by his brother, Ali bin Said.

Life
In 1870 his elder brother and predecessor Barghash bin Said had him imprisoned for the (alleged) entanglement in a coup attempt. According to their sister Emily Ruete, Barghash did not release Khalifah before one of their sisters prepared to set out for a pilgrimage for Mecca, and "he did not want to bring down upon himself a curse pronounced in the Holy City of the Prophet. But his sister did not pardon him before he had set free the innocent Chalîfe."

Emily Ruete wrote in 1886:

According to Ruete, Barghash continued to spy on Khalifah and his friends. She notes one instance where Barghash apparently willfully ruined a wealthy chief and friend of  Khalifah, so that Khalifah would be deprived of support from rich chiefs. He became Sultan upon the sudden death of his brother during the protracted negotiations with the German East Africa Company. Unlike his brother, he gave in to lease the Tanganyika coast of mainland East Africa to the Germans, which immediately led to the Abushiri Revolt.

Sayyid Khalifa I was appointed an Honorary Knight Grand Cross of the United Kingdom's Most Distinguished Order of Saint Michael and Saint George on 18 December 1889.

Honours
Knight Grand Cross of the Order of St Michael and St George (GCMG)-1888

Footnotes

References
Ruete, Emily, Ulrich Haarmann (Editor), E. Van Donzel (Editor), Leiden, Netherlands, (1992): An Arabian Princess Between Two Worlds: Memoirs, Letters Home, Sequels to the Memoirs, Syrian Customs and Usages.  

Al Said dynasty
1852 births
1890 deaths
Khalifah bin Said Al-Busaid
Honorary Knights Grand Cross of the Order of St Michael and St George
Zanzibari royalty
19th-century Arabs
19th-century Omani people